Elisabeth Thand Ringqvist, nee Eriksson, (born 20 February 1972) is a Swedish politician for the Center Party. She is a member of the Riksdagen since 2022, for Stockholm. On 7 November 2022, Thand Ringqvist was announced as one of the candidates for the leadership role of the Center Party, which she did not win.

References

External links 

1972 births
Living people
21st-century Swedish women politicians
21st-century Swedish politicians
People from Stockholm
Women members of the Riksdag
Members of the Riksdag from the Centre Party (Sweden)
Members of the Riksdag 2022–2026